Rydingia is a genus of plants in the family Lamiaceae, first described in 2007. The genus is native to eastern Africa and south-western Asia, and found in Eritrea, Ethiopia, Iran, Oman, Pakistan, West Himalaya and Yemen.

The genus was circumscribed by Anne-Cathrine Scheen and Victor Anthony Albert in Syst. & Geogr. Pl. vol.77 (2) on page 234 in 2007.

The genus name of Rydingia is in honour of Per Olof Ryding (b.1951), a Swedish botanist and plant collector in Africa, from the University of Copenhagen in Denmark.

Species
As accepted by Plants of the World Online;
Rydingia integrifolia (Benth.) Scheen & V.A.Albert - Eritrea, Ethiopia, Yemen
Rydingia limbata (Benth.) Scheen & V.A.Albert - Pakistan, Kashmir
Rydingia michauxii (Briq.) Scheen & V.A.Albert - Iran
Rydingia persica (Burm.f.) Scheen & V.A.Albert - Iran, Oman, Pakistan

References

Lamiaceae
Lamiaceae genera
Flora of Eritrea
Flora of Ethiopia
Flora of Iran
Flora of Oman
Flora of Yemen
Flora of Pakistan
Flora of West Himalaya